Jason Howland is a musical theatre composer, playwright, conductor, music director, and producer. In 2015, he won the Grammy Award for Best Musical Theater Album for his work producing the cast recording of Beautiful: The Carole King Musical. He also wrote the music for the Broadway musical Little Women.

Biography
Howland was born June 16, 1971, in Concord, Massachusetts, and grew up in Williamstown, Massachusetts (Little Women is set in New England). As a teenager, he attended Berkshire Ensemble for the Theatre Arts (a camp for aspiring musical-theatre composers and librettists).
While at Williams College, he was called to be an intern on the 1992 Vivian Matalon workshop of Jekyll & Hyde and worked his way up, becoming friendly with both composer Frank Wildhorn and arranger James Raitt, and eventually became the music director and conductor of the 1997 Broadway production.

In 2002, Howland wrote a play with Larry Pellegrini called Blessing in Disguise which premiered Off-Broadway.

His assorted credits include musical director for Beautiful: The Carole King Musical, music supervisor for The Scarlet Pimpernel and The Civil War, music director of Les Misérables,  music director of Taboo, and supervising music director/incidental & dance music arrangements/vocal music arrangements of Wonderland. He also produced The Lonesome West with Davis.

He was the producer of Little Women with Dani Davis. The original songwriters were released, and Howland stepped down from producing to write the music with lyrics by Mindi Dickstein with a book by Allan Knee.

He has also appeared as a guest conductor with the Atlanta Symphony Orchestra, The Florida Orchestra, New Jersey Symphony Orchestra, Maine State Symphony, and Memphis Symphony Orchestra. He also has conducted for Ray Charles, Natalie Cole, Brandy, BeBe and CeCe Winans, Carl Anderson, Linda Eder, Sebastian Bach, David Hasselhoff, Rob Evan, Kate Shindle, Lauren Kennedy, Davis Gaines, the Kingston Trio, and Lizz Wright.

His other works include writing the score for Handel’s Messiah Rocks: A Joyful Noise and writing the score for the webisode series The Broadroom.

He also was working on two new musicals, Mariel and Quickstep.

Works
Little Women, 2004
Blessing in Disguise, 2002
A Killer Party, 2020
Paradise Square, 2022

References

External links
 
 
 

American male composers
American musical theatre composers
Living people
People from Williamstown, Massachusetts
Williams College alumni
Grammy Award winners
Year of birth missing (living people)